Chang Wei-chia (born 24 February 1981) is a Taiwanese freestyle swimmer. She competed in three events at the 1996 Summer Olympics.

References

External links
 

1981 births
Living people
Taiwanese female freestyle swimmers
Olympic swimmers of Taiwan
Swimmers at the 1996 Summer Olympics
Place of birth missing (living people)